Oxetanone may refer to:

 2-Oxetanone, also called beta-Propiolactone
 3-Oxetanone